Orientations is a bimonthly print magazine published in Hong Kong and distributed worldwide since 1969. It is an authoritative source of information on the many and varied aspects of the arts of East and Southeast Asia, the Himalayas, the Indian subcontinent and the Middle East, from the latest scholarly research to market analysis and current news. The articles are contributed by leading academics and curators around the world and its readers are collectors, gallerists, academics and students. It is an essential addition to any art library.

Orientations offers individual and institutional digital subscriptions through Exact Editions. Digital access gives subscribers to archive issues back to January/February 2004.

OM Publishing is the book-publishing arm of Orientations Magazine Ltd. With expertise from five decades of editing, designing and printing Orientations to the highest of standards they are highly sought after by Asian art collectors, dealers and museums to produce a range of scholarly publications, including catalogues, monographs and artist books. The title, Beyond the Stage of Time: A Retrospective of Paintings by the Master of the Water, Pine, and Stone Retreat, was the winner of the Bronze Award, Hardcover category in the 2020 Gold Ink Awards, produced by Printing Impressions magazine.

History 
While Adrian Zecha is nowadays better known as a hotelier and founder of Aman Resorts, his first career was a journalist and subsequently, publisher. He launched Orientation in 1969 because he believe Asian art and culture deserved a magazine of its own. The name was a play on the word 'Orient' which was what Asia was referred to back then.

Under Elizabeth Knight in 1981, the editorial was reshaped to focus on Asian Art.

Yifawn Lee is the current publisher and editor who joined the magazine in 2008. In 2014, she founded Asian Art Hong Kong as a platform to provide art-related lectures and events. In 2021, Asian Art in Hong Kong was rebranded as Orientations Art Circle.

References

External links 
 Official website

Visual arts magazines
Asian art
Magazines published in Hong Kong
Magazines established in 1969
Art history journals
Bi-monthly magazines